The Sachs MadAss is an underbone motorcycle  available in a ,  or
 assembled in Malaysia and manufactured in China and distributed by German automotive company Sachs Motorcycles since 2004.  The engine is based on the popular horizontal one cylinder originally used in Honda mopeds and small motorcycles from the late 1960s.

It incorporates the fuel tank into the frame and has no external bodywork or fairings. It has a stainless steel under-seat exhaust, a four-speed manual gearbox or automatic transmission and dual hydraulic disc brake. The front headlights are positioned vertically.

The MadAss has been sold in the US as the Xkeleton Trickster, and under the Pierspeed and Tomberlin brands as the MadAss.  In Canada, it was also sold as the AMG Nitro.

As of December 2014, the Madass 50 is once again available in the US in 49cc form, via a new distributor, Excalibur Motorsports of Chino, California.  It is CARB certified for sale and use in the state of California.

References

Sachs MadAss 125 Review, Yahaya Abdullah, Edited by webBikeWorld.com 

2010 Sachs MadAss 125 Review, Steve Guzman, November 26, 2009 Motorcycle-USA.com
Sachs MadAss 125 tested, July 8, 2011, CMGonline.com
This ‘motorcycle' needs a lot of work, Steve Bond, Fri Aug 12 2011, The Toronto Star

MadAss
Motorcycles introduced in 2004